The Druid Circle is a 1947 play by the British-American writer John Van Druten. It was staged in a run at the Morosco Theatre on Broadway from 22 October 1947, lasting for seventy performances. The cast included Leo G. Carroll and Ethel Griffies. A British university professor, frustrated to be working in a provincial institution, discovers a love letter written by one of his students to a girl. After humiliating them both, the Professor comes to realise too late the meanness of his actions.

References

Bibliography
 Gerald Bordman. American Theatre: A Chronicle of Comedy and Drama, 1930-1969. Oxford University Press, 1996.

1947 plays
Plays by John Van Druten